Tropidomarga is a genus of sea snails, marine gastropod mollusks in the family Trochidae, the top snails.

This genus was previously included in the family Trochidae.

Species
Species within the genus Tropidomarga include:
 Tropidomarga biangulata A. W. B. Powell, 1951

References

 Smithsonian - National Museum of History: Tropidomarga

External links
 To ITIS
 To World Register of Marine Species

 
Trochidae
Monotypic gastropod genera